Danny D'Souza (born November 14, 1977) is a track and field sprint athlete who competes internationally for the Seychelles.

D'Souza represented the Seychelles at the 2008 Summer Olympics in Beijing. He competed at the 100 metres sprint and placed 7th in his heat without advancing to the second round. He ran the distance in a time of 11.00 seconds.

External links
 

1987 births
Living people
Seychellois male sprinters
Olympic athletes of Seychelles
Athletes (track and field) at the 2008 Summer Olympics
Athletes (track and field) at the 2010 Commonwealth Games
Commonwealth Games competitors for Seychelles